Indians in Japan consist of migrants from India to Japan and their descendants. As of June 2022, there were 40,752 Indian nationals living in Japan. Indians in Japan are primarily employed in the information technology industry and other office jobs where English language is used.

Migration history

According to the Nihon Shoki, in 1654 two men and two women of the Tushara Kingdom, along with one woman from Shravasti, were driven by a storm to take refuge at the former Hyūga Province in southern Kyushu. They remained for several years before setting off for home.

The history of modern Indian settlement in Japan goes back more than a century. As early as 1872, a few Indian businessmen and their families, primarily Parsis and Sindhis, had settled Yokohama as well as Okinawa. In 1891, Tata, then a small trading firm, established a branch in Kobe. By 1901, Japanese government statistics recorded 30 people from British India living in Japan. Local statistics of the Hyōgo Prefecture government showed 59 Indians living in the prefecture in 1905, among whom all but one were men. After the destruction wreaked on Yokohama in the 1923 Great Kantō earthquake, the Indian traders there also migrated to Kobe; from then on, Kobe became the center of Japan's Indian community's growth.

By 1939, on the eve of World War II, the number of Indians in Hyōgo Prefecture had reached 632. However, due to British sanctions against Japan and the 1941 halt of shipping between Japan and their homeland, many closed their shops and left; by 1942, there were only 114 remaining. Three years after the Partition of India, their numbers had recovered somewhat to 255. Prior to 1990, the Indian community in Japan remained centred on the Kobe area. However, after 1990, the numbers in Tokyo began to show a sharp increase. Migrants who arrived in the 1990s included industrial trainees sent by Japanese car manufacturers which had set up factories in India. IT professionals and their families also came to Tokyo, settling primarily in Setagaya and Minato wards.

Business and employment

, there were also around 800 Indians working in the IT industry in Japan, up from 120 in 1993. Kenichi Yoshida, a director of the Softbridge Solutions Japan Co., stated in late 2009 that the Indian engineers are becoming the backbone of Japan's IT industry and that "it is important for Japanese industry to work together with the India." Another 870 Indians were employed as cooks. Others are engaged in trading, importing the Indian handicrafts, garments, precious stones, and marine products, and exporting Japanese electronic goods, textiles, automotive parts, and jewellery.

Religion
Indians in Japan speak a number of different languages and follow various religions; there is little correlation between religion or language and profession, except in the case of the Jains, many of whom work in the jewellery industry. The Jains are generally concentrated around Okachi-machi in Taitō, Tokyo. On the whole, Tokyo has fewer religious facilities for Indians than Kobe.

There are Sikh gurudwaras in both Kobe and Tokyo; the latter is of more recent provenance, having been founded in 1999 in the basement of an office building. Some Sikhs employed as unskilled labourers in small and medium enterprises had to cut their hair short and remove their turbans in violation of the principle of kesh, because their employers are unfamiliar with their customs and do not give them any latitude in their style of dress. They consider this as just a temporary adaptation to Japanese society. However, this practise is not common among Sikhs in skilled professions such as IT.

Education

Indians who send their children to school in Japan generally select English-medium schools. The first Indian-specific school, India International School in Japan, was established in 2004 in Tokyo's Koto ward at the initiative of some of the old trading families based in Tokyo and Yokohama. The Global Indian International School, a Singapore-based school, has operated a branch in Tokyo since 2006, and plans to open another in Yokohama in 2008. They follow the Indian Central Board of Secondary Education curriculum. The schools are popular not just among Indian expatriates, but among some Japanese as well, due to a reputation for rigour in mathematics education. Other migrants leave their children behind in their native states, either with grandparents or at the boarding schools, in order to avoid interrupting their education.

Jeevarani "Rani Sanku" Angelina, established the Little Angels International School (now Musashi International School Tokyo), which caters to Japanese students.

Community organizations
One of the earliest Indian community organisations, the Oriental Club, was established in 1904 in Kobe; it changed its name to The India Club in 1913, and continued operating up to the present day. More were founded in the 1930s, including the Indian-dominated Silk Merchants' Association, the Indian Social Society, and the Indian Chamber of Commerce. In 2000, Indian expatriates living in Edogawa, Tokyo, an area with a high concentration of Indian IT engineers founded the Indian Community of Edogawa. Others include the Indian Community Activities Tokyo, whose Diwali celebration draws 2,500 participants, as well as the Indian Merchants Association of Yokohama.

Notable people

 Anastasia Malhotra, professional tennis player (Indian-British/Greek-British father)
 Annu Mari, actress
 Arata Izumi, football player (Indian father)
 Bob Singh Dhillon, businessman
 Bodhisena, Buddhist scholar and monk
 Gonsalo Garcia, Roman Catholic saint
 Pico Iyer, author
 Priyanka Yoshikawa, fashion model
 Sarbjit Singh Chadha, enka singer
 Jaideep Singh, kickboxer
 Yogendra Puranik, a politician
 Koel Purie, actress

See also
 Non-resident Indian and Person of Indian Origin
 India–Japan relations
 Hinduism in Japan
 Japanese people in India

Notes

Sources

Further reading
 
 
 
 

Demographics of Japan
Ethnic groups in Japan
 
 
India–Japan relations
Immigration to Japan